is a Japanese manga series written and illustrated by Shizuya Wazarai. The first series, Kentō Ankoku Den Cestvs, was serialized in Hakusensha's Young Animal  from 1997 to 2009, with its chapters collected in 15 tankōbon volumes. A second series, Kendo Shitō Den Cestvs, was serialized in Young Animal from 2010 to 2014, later transferred to Young Animal Arashi, where it ran from 2014 to 2018, until the magazine ceased its publication; it was published on Manga Park online platform from 2018 to 2020, and was transferred to Young Animal Zero in 2020. An anime television series adaptation produced and animated by Bandai Namco Pictures (with 3D animation by Logic&Magic) aired on Fuji TV's +Ultra late night anime block from April to June 2021.

Characters

Media

Manga
Cestvs: The Roman Fighter is written and illustrated by Shizuya Wazarai. Wazarai published  in Hakusensha's Young Animal from 1997 to 2009. Hakusensha collected its chapters in fifteen tankōbon volumes, released from May 29, 1998, to May 29, 2009.

A sequel, titled  began in Young Animal on May 28, 2010. The series was transferred to Young Animal Arashi in 2014. After Young Animal Arashi ceased publication in 2018, the series was transferred to Manga Park web platform. Hakusensha released the first tankōbon volume on April 28, 2011. As of March 29, 2021, ten volumes have been released.

Volume list

Kentō Ankoku Den Cestvs

Kendo Shitō Den Cestvs

Anime
An anime television series adaptation was announced in November 2020. The series was directed by Kazuya Monma, with Toshifumi Kawase serving as chief director and script supervisor, and produced by Bandai Namco Pictures. Masahiro Tokuda, Akihiro Manabe, and Yoshiyasu Ueda are composing the music. Logic&Magic are producing the CG. The boxing scenes are supervised by professional boxer Yoshihiro Kamegai. The 3D character designs are handled by Kei Yoshikuni, while the 2D character designs are handled by Yuka Shiga and Ako Nakazawa. The series aired on Fuji TV's +Ultra late night anime block from April 15 to June 24, 2021. The opening theme song, "Endeavor", is performed by Dragon Ash, while the ending theme song, "Kirei Da" (You're Beautiful), is performed by Sarasa Kadowaki. Crunchyroll licensed the series outside of Asia.

Episode list

Notes

References

External links
 
 

+Ultra
2021 anime television series debuts
Anime series based on manga
Bandai Namco Pictures
Boxing in anime and manga
Crunchyroll anime
Fuji TV original programming
Hakusensha manga
Historical anime and manga
Japanese webcomics
Seinen manga
Webcomics in print